Thodannur is a village in thiruvallur grama panchayath, Vatakara taluk, Kozhikode district of Kerala in India.  Thodannur block panchayath consists of Ayanchery, Maniyur, palayad, kottappalli, thiruvallur, and villiappally villages.

Schools

Nearest railway stations

Nearest airports

Schools near Thodannur

See also
 Orkkatteri
 Nadapuram
 Thottilpalam
 Perambra
 Madappally
 Villiappally
 Memunda
 Iringal
 Mahe, Pondicherry
 Payyoli
 Thikkodi

References

Villages in Kozhikode district